In the Beginning is the first compilation album from the rock band Journey, containing songs from the group's first three albums (Journey, Look into the Future, and Next). The songs on this album are all taken from the period where Gregg Rolie sang lead vocals, before Steve Perry joined the band as their new lead singer in 1977.

Track listing
Side one
 "Of a Lifetime" (Gregg Rolie, George Tickner, Neal Schon) - 6:48
 "Topaz" (Tickner) - 6:09
 "Kohoutek" (Schon, Rolie) - 6:40

Side two
 "On a Saturday Night" (Rolie) - 3:55
 "It's All Too Much" (George Harrison) - 4:01
 "In My Lonely Feeling/Conversations" (Rolie / Ross Valory) - 4:56
 "Mystery Mountain" (Rolie, Tickner, Diane Valory) - 4:23

Side three
 "Spaceman" (Rolie, Aynsley Dunbar) - 4:00
 "People" (Schon, Rolie, Dunbar) - 5:19
 "Anyway" (Rolie) - 4:10
 "You're on Your Own" (Schon, Rolie, Tickner) - 5:52

Side four
 "Look into the Future" (Schon, Rolie, D. Valory) - 8:08
 "Nickel and Dime" (R. Valory, Schon, Rolie, Tickner) - 4:11
 "I'm Gonna Leave You" (Schon, Rolie, Tickner) - 6:56

References

Journey (band) compilation albums
1980 compilation albums
Columbia Records compilation albums
Albums produced by Glen Kolotkin